The Irishman (1960) is a Miles Franklin Award-winning novel by Australian author Elizabeth O'Conner.

Story outline

The novel follows the experiences of Paddy Doolan, an Irish horse wagoner and his son Michael in the Gulf Country of north-eastern Australia. It is set in the early 1920s when horse-drawn transport was challenged by the advent of motor vehicles and aircraft—change which Doolan cannot accept.

Film adaptation

In 1978, the book was adapted for the screen and directed by Donald Crombie in a film of the same name. The film featured Michael Craig, Simon Burke and Robyn Nevin in the lead roles.

References

1960 Australian novels
Miles Franklin Award-winning works
Novels set in Australia
Australian novels adapted into films
Angus & Robertson books